The discography of American rock band The Shins consists of five studio albums, one live album, one remix album, three extended plays, two splits, twenty-three singles, and twenty one music videos.

Albums

Studio albums

Live albums

Remix albums

Splits

Extended plays

Singles

Main singles

Promotional singles

Other appearances

Music videos

Notes

References

External links
 Official website
 The Shins at AllMusic

Rock music group discographies
Discographies of American artists